Chris Reid (born 4 November 1971) is a Scottish former association football goalkeeper, who played for Hibernian, Hamilton Academical and Stirling Albion. Reid spent nearly 10 years at Hibs, but only played in 35 league games as Hibs enjoyed the services of other goalkeepers, including Scotland internationals Andy Goram and Jim Leighton. Reid was an unused substitute as Hibs lost the 1993 Scottish League Cup Final to Rangers, with Leighton playing in goal.

Reid left Hibs in 1998 to sign for Hamilton Academical, but he suffered a bad injury on his debut for Hamilton. He left Hamilton in 2000 to sign for Stirling Albion. Reid played in 78 league matches in three seasons for Stirling. While with Hibs, he was capped by the Scotland national under-21 football team.

References

External links 

1971 births
Association football goalkeepers
Hamilton Academical F.C. players
Hibernian F.C. players
Living people
Scotland under-21 international footballers
Scottish Football League players
Scottish footballers
Stirling Albion F.C. players
Footballers from Edinburgh
Bathgate Thistle F.C. players